Robin Buwalda (born 17 August 1994) is a Dutch footballer who plays as a centre back, most recently for IFK Mariehamn. He also formerly played for ADO Den Haag, VVV-Venlo, NEC Nijmegen and Go Ahead Eagles.

Club career
Buwalda began his career with ADO Den Haag and made his professional debut on 18 March 2012 in a 2–0 defeat against Ajax. ADO then loaned him to VVV-Venlo for two seasons and he joined NEC on a free transfer in summer 2016.

References

External links
 Voetbal International profile 

1994 births
Living people
People from Leidschendam
Association football central defenders
Dutch footballers
Dutch expatriate footballers
Eredivisie players
Eerste Divisie players
Veikkausliiga players
ADO Den Haag players
VVV-Venlo players
NEC Nijmegen players
Go Ahead Eagles players
IFK Mariehamn players
Dutch expatriate sportspeople in Finland
Expatriate footballers in Finland
Footballers from South Holland